Space Delta 3 (DEL 3) is a United States Space Force unit responsible for presenting operational combat-ready space electromagnetic warfare forces in support of assigned missions. It is headquartered at Peterson Space Force Base.

Activated on 24 July 2020, it replaced the former 21st Space Wing's 721st Operations Group upon establishment. The 721st Operations Group was activated on 10 October 2019 partly by realigning units from the former 21st Operations Group to focus securing the electromagnetic spectrum for national security space operations.

History 
In December 2021, DEL 3 was awarded as the best delta in Space Operations Command. The delta's three operational units were redesignated as electromagnetic warfare squadrons on April 15, 2022.

Structure 
DEL 3 is a component of Space Operations Command, one of eight deltas aligned under the field command. It is composed of the 3rd Combat Training Squadron, which provides advanced training to the delta's members, and three operational units, the 4th Electromagnetic Warfare Squadron, 5th Electromagnetic Warfare Squadron, and 16th Electromagnetic Warfare Squadron. It is also augmented by four Air National Guard units, the 114th Space Control Squadron, 138th Space Control Squadron, 216th Space Control Squadron, and 293rd Space Control Squadron, and the Air Force Reserve's 380th Space Control Squadron

It plans to add a defensive space electronic unit in Guam.

List of commanders

References

External links 

Deltas of the United States Space Force